Every Day is a New Day is the twenty-second studio album by American singer Diana Ross, released on May 4, 1999 by Motown Records. Ross consulted a number of new collaborators to work with her on the album, including Arif Mardin, Chuckii Booker, Christopher Ward, Malik Pendleton, Ric Wake, and Daryl Simmons. Its release coincided with the broadcast of the ABC television motion picture, Double Platinum (1999), in which Ross co-starred with singer Brandy and her character performed several songs from Every Day is a New Day

The album debuted and peaked at number 108 on the US Billboard 200 and number 47 on the US Top R&B/Hip-Hop Albums, also reaching number 73 in the United Kingdom, where it became her lowest-charting album of original material since Ross (1978). Every Day is a New Day marked Ross' final contractual album released during her second Motown tenure until the label released her previously-shelved jazz standards album, Blue, a 1970s studio album, in 2006 and would also be Ross' last studio album of new material for another seven years.

Background
On this album, Ross continued to contribute to compositions, co-writing the bonus tracks "Free (I'm Gone)" and "Drop the Mask", the former once again addressing "the divorce album" issue with lyrics of romantic dissension. These tracks were only available on the Japanese edition of the album. The album also includes cover versions of Martha Wash's 1992 US club hit "Carry On" and "He Lives in You" from The Lion King musical.

Ross continued to have a much more vibrant recording career outside of the US, though her popularity on the touring circuit in the US remained vibrant. She delivered several television specials throughout the millennium years. UK TV promotion for the album included the ITV special An Audience with Diana Ross. On the special, along with past hits, the songs Ross performed from Every Day Is a New Day were "He Lives in You" and the single "Not Over You Yet", recreating elements of the music video with choreography. Singer Boy George duetted with her on the number one single "Upside Down".

Critical reception

Allmusic editor Stephen Thomas Erlewine called Every Day Is a New Day Ross' "most carefully conceived album in years, filled with immaculate productions that appealed either to the dancefloor or adult contemporary radio. The problem is, there wasn't much to recommend in the way of songs. Although the album sounds good, nothing on it truly catches hold the way [...] As a result, Every Day Is a New Day stands as nothing more than a stylish but failed comeback." Alec Foege wrote in his review for People that Every Day Is a New Day was "an album that melds her enduring style with fresh substance [...] For more than 30 years, Ross has lured her fans. Looks like she’ll be keeping them." Chicago Sun Times critic Miriam DiNunzio found that "There is much to celebrate about this twelve-cut songfest from the supreme pop diva."

Chart performance
In the United States, Every Day Is a New Day peaked at number 108 on the US Billboard 200 and at number 47 on the Top R&B/Hip-Hop Albums. This marked Ross' highest-charting release since her 1991 studio album The Force Behind the Power. Elswehere, the album failed to chart. It, however, reached, number 73 on the UK Albums Chart, becoming her lowest-charting album of original material since Ross (1978). The album sold around 100,000 copies in the US.

Every Day Is a New Day yielded several singles, including Ross' final hit single of the 1990s in the UK, "Not Over You Yet", which was remixed and became a top ten hit, peaking at number 9 in the UK Singles Chart. A remix of "Until We Meet Again" reached number 2 on the US Dance Club Songs. "Sugarfree", though not released as a single, received urban adult airplay in the United States and peaked at number 21 on the Bubbling Under R&B/Hip-Hop Songs.

Track listing

Notes
 signifies an additional producer

Charts

References

1999 albums
Motown albums
Diana Ross albums
Albums produced by Arif Mardin